Bishop's Cleeve railway station was a railway station that served the village of Bishop's Cleeve in Gloucestershire, England.

It was opened by the Great Western Railway in 1906, on its line between Stratford-upon-Avon and Cheltenham. It closed in March 1960, though the line itself remained open until 1976. The track was later lifted.

From 1997 to 2001 the line was relaid by the Gloucestershire Warwickshire Railway (G-WR) through the station site and later reopened in 2003, though there are currently no plans to rebuild the station site, .

The Midland Railway also opened a station, called Cleeve, on the nearby Birmingham and Gloucester Railway in 1843.

References

Former Great Western Railway stations
Disused railway stations in Gloucestershire
Railway stations in Great Britain opened in 1906
Railway stations in Great Britain closed in 1960